Strong verb may refer to:

Germanic strong verb, a verb that marks its past tense by means of changes to the stem vowel
Strong inflection, a system of verb conjugation contrasted with an alternative "weak" system in the same language
Irregular verb, any verb whose conjugation does not follow the typical pattern of the language to which it belongs

See also
 Weak verb (disambiguation)